May 2010 tornado outbreak may refer to:

Tornado outbreak of April 30 – May 2, 2010
Tornado outbreak of May 10–13, 2010
Late-May 2010 tornado outbreak